Fighter Squadron 82 or VF-82 was an aviation unit of the United States Navy. Originally established as Reserve Squadron VF-742 it was called to active duty during World War II and later recalled on 2 February 1951, redesignated VF-82 on 4 February 1953, it was disestablished on 15 April 1959. It was the third US Navy squadron to be designated VF-82.

Operational history
VF-742 was assigned to Carrier Air Group 8 (CVG-8) an all-reserve carrier wing.

Home port assignments
NAS Jacksonville
NAS Oceana

Aircraft assignment
F4U-4 Corsair
F9F-5 Panther
F2H-4 Banshee
F3H-2N Demon

See also
History of the United States Navy
List of inactive United States Navy aircraft squadrons
List of United States Navy aircraft squadrons

References

External links

Strike fighter squadrons of the United States Navy